793 Arizona is a minor planet orbiting the Sun that was discovered April 9, 1907 by American businessman Percival Lowell at Flagstaff. It was named for the state of Arizona. The object was independently discovered on April 17, 1907 by J. H. Metcalf at Taunton. The orbital plane is inclined at an angle of 15.8° to the plane of the ecliptic.

Photometric observations at the Palmer Divide Observatory in Colorado Springs, Colorado during the winter of 2007–2008 were used to build a light curve for this asteroid. It spans a diameter of approximately 29 km and is a candidate D-type asteroid with an unusual spectrum.

See also
 List of minor planets: 1–1000

References

External links 
 Lightcurve plot of 793 Arizona, Palmer Divide Observatory, B. D. Warner (2007)
 Asteroid Lightcurve Database (LCDB), query form (info )
 Dictionary of Minor Planet Names, Google books
 Asteroids and comets rotation curves, CdR – Observatoire de Genève, Raoul Behrend
 Discovery Circumstances: Numbered Minor Planets (1)–(5000) – Minor Planet Center
 
 

000793
Discoveries by Percival Lowell
000793
Named minor planets
000793
000793
19070409